Reuben Thomas Durrett  (January 22, 1824 – September 16, 1913) was a lawyer, jurist, linguist, poet, editor, journalist, history writer, and Kentucky bibliographer. In 1871, Durrett founded the failed The Public Library of Kentucky. In 1884, Durrett founded the Filson Club, now the Filson Historical Society.

Early life
Durrett was born January 22, 1824, in Henry County, Kentucky. Durrett's primary schooling as a boy was in Henry County. After graduating from high school, from 1844 until 1846, he attended Georgetown College some 50 miles away in Georgetown, Kentucky. Durrett then attended Brown University in Providence, Rhode Island. He earned a Bachelor's degree in 1849.

Durrett went then to the University of Louisville and took up courses in law. He earned a Bachelor of Laws degree in one year (1850), which was normally a two-year course of study. Durrett received an honorary Master's degree in 1853 from Brown University. In time he received from the three colleges he attended the Doctor of law honorary degree.

Adult

Durrett then practiced law in Louisville for almost thirty years after receiving his law degree. During his law career he served one term on the Louisville City Council and in 1852 campaigned for Winfield Scott for president. On July 21, 1857, Durrett was in a pistol duel with George D. Prentice over statements made between their two rival newspapers. In 1861 he spent a short time in prison for his views on secession. During the time he was a lawyer he obtained a half interest in Louisville Courier newspaper and was its editor until 1859.

Durrett was an avid collector of historical material, especially pertaining to Kentucky. He had an extensive library. In 1871 several citizens of Louisville were considering creating a local library. Some citizens thought a circulating library with an annual fee was a route to go. Durrett did a study on why libraries that charged for the use of books failed eventually. He had the viewpoint that books should be made available free to use by anyone. He drew up a library charter and created "The Public Library of Kentucky". He was the library's first president. Eventually this became the Louisville Free Public Library and it inherited Durrett's historical collection of rare books and historical material as its core collection.

Durrett wrote poetry in the 1850s and retired as a Louisville lawyer in 1880. His retirement hobby was that of writing and collecting historical material. In his historical activities he gathered friends and went on "historic excursions". These excursions consisted of trips throughout the Kentucky countryside using old authentic maps, some made by John Filson. It is believed that the notion for a local historical society was sparked when the 27th Governor of Ohio Charles Anderson accompanied him and his friends on one of these excursions. On May 15, 1884, it was established that every first Monday of each month his friends would get together at Durrett's home library (Brook and Chestnut Streets). It eventually became the Filson Historical Society (a.k.a. The Filson Club). Its main purpose was the preserving of Kentucky history by collecting rare unpublished material. Durrett, being the main organizer, became its first president. Durrett's home became the meeting place of the Club from 1884 to 1913. Many historians, including Theodore Roosevelt (Winning of the West), used The Filson Club and Durrett's library.

Family genealogy

Durrett is from French ancestors that can be traced back to a well known French physician named Louis Duret that lived in the sixteenth century. The American family line in the United States of all Durretts can trace their genealogy back to three brothers (John, Richard, and Bartholomew Durrett), descendants of Louis Duret that immigrated from England to Spotsylvania County, Virginia, in the eighteenth century.

Durrett was a son of William and Elizabeth Rawlings Durrett. His father, a wealthy farmer, built the first brick house in Henry County about 1813 some 2 miles north of New Castle and is where Durrett was born and raised. Francis Durrett, the father to William Durrett and grandfather to the subject of this article, served under George Rogers Clark during the Illinois campaign. After the campaign Francis went back to his home in Henry County, which was then part of Virginia. This is where William Durrett, father to the subject of this article, was born and raised.

Durrett married Elizabeth Humphreys Bates from Cincinnati, Ohio, on December 16, 1852. They had four children. Durrett had one son that lived to adulthood, William T. Durrett, a medical doctor. His other children all died before he did.
  Lily Bates Durrett (1859 - 1881)
  Florence Montgomery Durrett (1863 - 1869)
  Reuben Thomas Durrett (1886 - 1890)

Surname origin

The Durretts are of French origin, the surname having been originally spelled "Duret" in France. Because of the St. Bartholomew's Day massacre, some Durets that followed the Protestant faith, left France and went to England. In England, the French name "Duret" was pronounced like the English name "Duray" to get the French sound of the name. In time then, to differentiate one name from the other another "r" and another "t" were added to the French name Duret making the English version of the French surname spelled then as "Durrett".

Death
Durrett died in Louisville on September 16, 1913. He is buried at Cave Hill Cemetery of the same city.

Legacy
Durett's manuscript collection was acquired by the University of Chicago Library in 1913. Also included was an important and large collection of rare books and periodicals. The collection is organized and divided into a dozen groups from "Pictures, Maps, and Sketches" to historical manuscripts and personal papers.

Durrett's Filson Club has changed its name to the Filson Historical Society and is now located in the Old Louisville neighborhood. The Filson Historical Society has a research facilities which includes a manuscript collection as well as a library that includes rare books, periodicals, maps, and other published materials. The Filson also maintains a small museum.

Published works
 The Quest for a Lost Race (1907)
 The centenary of Louisville (1893)
 The Centenary of Kentucky (1892)
  Night Scene at Drennon Springs  (1850)
 Public Library Paper: Supplement (1893)
 The Romance of the Origin of Louisville (1894)
  Old Year and New in the Coliseum at Rome  (1856)
  John Filson, the First Historian of Kentucky (1884)
 The [Kentucky] Resolutions of 1798 and 1799 (1886)
  Thoughts Over the Grave of Rev. Thomas Smith  (1852)
 An Historical Sketch of St. Paul's Church, Louisville, Ky (1889)
 Boonesborough. Its Founding, Pioneer Struggles, Indian Experiences, Transylvania Days, and Revolutionary Annals (1901)
 Traditions of the Earliest Visits of Foreigners to North America, the First Formed and First Inhabited of the Continents (1908)
 The Battle of New Orleans; Including the Previous Engagements Between the Americans and the British, the Indians, and the Spanish, which Led to the Final Conflict on the 8th of January, 1815 {Introduction only} (1904)

References

Bibliography

External links

Reuben T. Durrett Memorial at Find a Grave.

1824 births
1913 deaths
People from Henry County, Kentucky
Kentucky lawyers
People of Kentucky in the American Civil War
Georgetown College (Kentucky) alumni
Brown University alumni
University of Louisville School of Law alumni
Kentucky city council members
Writers from Louisville, Kentucky
Burials at Cave Hill Cemetery
19th-century American politicians
19th-century American lawyers